Dahlia hesperioides is a moth of the family Noctuidae first described by Arnold Pagenstecher in 1900. It is found on the Bismarck Archipelago of New Guinea.

References

Moths described in 1900
Calpinae